Chernoles culture or Black Forest culture (Чорноліська культура) is an Iron Age archaeological unit dating ca. 1025–700 BC. This location corresponds to where Herodotus later placed his Scythian ploughmen. From 200 BC, the culture was overrun by the arrival of Germanic and Celtic settlers to the region.

Features
Chernolesian settlements include open sites and also fortified sites surrounded by multiple banks and ditches. Houses were usually surface-dwellings and of substantial size, ~ 10 x 6 m. Artifacts found in settlements include stone and bronze axes, weapons, bronze ornaments, and iron tools. Cultivated wheat, barley, and millet were staples. The economy was agricultural, with stockbreeding. Bronze artefacts indicate significant contact with Scythian nomads, and finds of finer ceramic wares suggest contact with Thrace and Black Sea Greek colonies. Inhabitants practised biritual burials: inhumation under barrows and cremation in urnfields (the latter predominated in later periods).

Development
Classical Chernoles period finished c. 500 BC, corresponding to a simplification in the material culture, interpreted to represent a pauperization due to the political domination of the forest-steppe communities by Scythians. In these latter stages, we see an increase in fortified settlements, perhaps representing a defensive measure against the nomads (with earthen ramparts, ditches and timber walls). Despite the difficulties, settlement density actually increases, and the socio-cultural traditions continued.

Notes

References
 James P. Mallory, "Chernoles Culture", Encyclopedia of Indo-European Culture, Fitzroy Dearborn, 1997.
 Boris Rybakov on Chernoles Culture (in Russian)
 Boris Grekov on Chernoles Culture (in Russian)

Archaeological cultures of Eastern Europe
Archaeological cultures in Ukraine
Slavic archaeological cultures
Iron Age cultures of Europe